Khaled Ayari (born 17 January 1990) is a Tunisian professional footballer who plays as a forward for Luxembourg National Division club Hostert.

Career
Ayari played for French club Orléans one season.

On 12 September 2017, he signed with Bulgarian club Lokomotiv Plovdiv for  years.

References

External links
 
 
 

1990 births
Living people
People from Aryanah
Tunisian footballers
Association football forwards
AS Ariana players
Espérance Sportive de Tunis players
Angers SCO players
Paris FC players
US Orléans players
PFC Lokomotiv Plovdiv players
Rodez AF players
US Hostert players
Tunisian Ligue Professionnelle 1 players
Ligue 2 players
Championnat National players
Championnat National 3 players
First Professional Football League (Bulgaria) players
Luxembourg National Division players
Tunisian expatriate footballers
Tunisian expatriate sportspeople in France
Tunisian expatriate sportspeople in Bulgaria
Expatriate footballers in France
Expatriate footballers in Bulgaria
Expatriate footballers in Luxembourg